Katherine 'KT' Taylor (born 1974, Midland, Texas) is an American artist and sculptor living and working between Houston, Texas; Keene, New York; and Eibar, Spain. She works with many materials, including stainless steel, bronze and aluminum. Taylor has been worked with the foundry Alfa Arte for more than a decade. Her work is represented by the Skoto Gallery in New York City.  Taylor's recent commissions will soon be found in Brookline, Massachusetts and St. Paul's School in Concord, New Hampshire. Her next adventure is taking her to the Arctic Circle in the summer of 2018 thanks to the generous support of The Farm, Inc., Alfa Arte, and the Skoto Gallery.

Early life and education 

Taylor was born in Midland, a city in western Texas, in October 1974. Taylor earned her Bachelor of Arts from Dartmouth College (1997) and her MFA from the University of Melbourne. In 2005, Taylor moved to London to work and exhibit at the  Wimbledon Art Studios. She then moved to Spain to start working with Alfa Arte. After three years in Spain, she moved to Houston, Texas, where she presently resides with her husband and their dog Boo.

Exhibitions 

Taylor began exhibiting in the late 1990s and has since taken part in over 40 individual and group exhibitions in Europe, North America and Australia.

Solo exhibitions

Group exhibitions

Awards 
Katherine has received multiple grants and scholarship from different foundations and schools

References

External links
Alfa Arte
 ktcreature.com

1974 births
Living people
American women sculptors
21st-century American women artists